Themes 2, also referred to as Themes, Vol. 2, is a studio album by a multimedia collective Psychic TV, released by Temple Records in 1985. It is the second album in the Themes series, predeced by Themes – initially an accompanying release to Force the Hand of Chance – and followed up by Themes 3, and was recorded as a soundtrack for videos by a British filmmaker Derek Jarman.

Track listing 
Adapted from a 1997 Cold Spring release.

Personnel 
Adapted from the liner notes of both vinyl and CD versions of Themes 2.
 Psychic TV  – recording and performing
 Genesis P-Orridge – production, artwork, liner notes, remastering (1997 release)
 Larry Thrasher – co-production and remastering (1997 release)
 Raymond Watts – engineer (credited as “Nains”)
 Steve Angel – mastering (1985 release)

References 

1985 albums
Psychic TV albums